Hypaedalea neglecta is a moth of the  family Sphingidae. It is found from Cameroon to Uganda.

The length of the forewings is about 27 mm. The thorax upperside has a large dorsal patch of raised olive-brown scales continued from the head. The labial palps are pale yellowish-buff below, dark purplish-brown above and reddish laterally. The legs are yellowish-buff. The forewing upperside has a large dark brown blotch posterior of the discal cell between the submarginal and median lines.

References

Macroglossini
Moths described in 1972
Insects of Cameroon
Moths of Africa
Insects of Uganda